The Football Association of Maldives (FAM), founded in 1982, is the governing body of football in the Maldives. The association under the guidance of the Ministry of Youth & Sports is responsible for all regulatory aspects of the sport in the Maldives. In 1986, FAM became a member of AFC and FIFA respectively.

For the full history, statistics and records of the senior team, see Maldives national football team.

Organization 

The FAM has an executive committee of five members under the President, in addition to a Senior Vice President, Vice President and General Secretary. FAM is housed in FAM House in Malé, which was constructed with funding from FIFA "Goal" Project.

While FIFA and AFC required their members to constitute elected governance, FAM first had an appointed governance by the government of Maldives, which was reshuffled by the Ministry of Youth in the last quarter of 2006, in association with the political changes President Maumoon Abdul Gayoom brought about. FAM was audited by the Audit Office (during the same period, i.e. late 2006) of the Republic of Maldives and the association was accused with embezzlement of funds. However, the Chairman Abdul Shukoor was not dismissed and the General Secretary Ibrahim Ismail Ali was transferred to a post in the Olympic Committee of the Maldives.

In July 2008, elective governance was introduced to FAM and Ali Azim was elected President of the association. On 26 January 2013, FAM held its second election according to FIFA and AFC Statutes and  Ilham Ahmed was elected as the President, and Mohamed Hanim as the General Secretary of FAM and subsequently appointed Hussain Jawaz as the General Secretary on 4 June 2014 upon Hanim's resignation. After a brief spell under the Normalization Committee appointed by FIFA on 2 December 2014 under the guidance of Mohamed Shaweed in May 2016, Ahmed Thariq was elected as the President and Bassam Adeel Jaleel was appointed as the General Secretary. However, with the dismissal of General Secretary Jaleel after three months of his term in office, President Thariq was forced out of the office due to resignation of five executive members followed by the reinstatement of Bassam as the General Secretary from FIFA due to unlawful statutory dismissal resulting in a call for election. Bassam contested with Thariq and was elected as the president on 20 November 2016. Hussain Jawaz was appointed as the General Secretary.

Role and events 

FAM is the governing body for football in the Maldives. It organizes the zone tournaments and the Dhivehi League, Maldives FA Cup, and the Cup Winners Cup. Maldivian football is divided by FAM into 3 divisions, in which the 1st Division consists of 10 clubs. The number of clubs in the 2nd and 3rd division has been quite inconsistent, and so has been the method and relegation rules so far. In December 2014 the Dhivehi League was reformed as the Dhivehi Premier League with 10 clubs. FAM is directly responsible for the organization of the individual matches, in which the referees come directly under the association and are not a separate entity, but rather as a referee's committee. It has been noted even in the season of 2007, many officials directly involved with clubs have been appointed as match commissioners in certain divisions.

Association staff

References

External links 
 FA Maldives official website
 Maldives at AFC site
 Maldives at FIFA site

Football in the Maldives
1982 establishments in the Maldives
Maldives
Sports organizations established in 1982